The Memphis Belle is a Boeing B-17F Flying Fortress used during the Second World War that inspired the making of two motion pictures: a 1944 documentary film, Memphis Belle: A Story of a Flying Fortress and the 1990 Hollywood feature film, Memphis Belle. It was one of the first United States Army Air Forces B-17 heavy bombers to complete 25 combat missions, after which the aircrew returned with the bomber to the United States to sell war bonds. In 2005 restoration began on the Memphis Belle at the National Museum of the United States Air Force at Wright-Patterson AFB in Dayton, Ohio where, since May 2018, it has been on display. The B-17 used in the 1990 feature film is housed at the National Warplane Museum in Geneseo, New York.

Crew

The crew for the Memphis Belle was as follows:
 Pilot: Captain Robert K. Morgan
 Co-pilot: Captain James A. Verinis
 Navigator: Captain Charles B. Leighton
 Bombardier: Captain Vincent B. Evans
 The First Engineer/Top Turret Gunner: Leviticus "Levy" Dillon
 The Second Engineer/Top Turret Gunner: Eugene Adkins
 The Third Engineer/Top Turret Gunner: Harold P. Loch
 Radio Operator: Robert Hanson
 Ball Turret Gunner: Cecil Scott
 Right Waist Gunner: E. Scott Miller
 Right Waist Gunner: Casmer A "Tony" Nastal
 Left Waist Gunner: Clarence E. "Bill" Winchell
 Tail Gunner: John P. Quinlan
 Crew Chief: Joe Giambrone
 Mascot: Stuka the Scottish Terrier

Combat history

The Memphis Belle, a Boeing-built B-17F-10-BO, manufacturer's serial number 3170, USAAC Serial No. 41-24485, was added to the USAAF inventory on 15 July 1942, and delivered in September 1942 to the 91st Bombardment Group at Dow Field, Bangor, Maine. It deployed to Prestwick, Scotland, on 30 September 1942, moving to a temporary base at RAF Kimbolton on 1 October, and then finally to its permanent base at RAF Bassingbourn, England, on 14 October. Each side of the fuselage bore the unit and aircraft identification markings of a B-17 of the 324th Bomb Squadron (Heavy), with the squadron code "DF" and individual aircraft letter "A".

Captain Robert K. Morgan's crew flew 25 combat missions with the 324th Bomb Squadron; all but four were in the Memphis Belle. The bomber's 25 combat missions, during which eight German aircraft were shot down by its aircrew, were:

 7 November 1942 – Brest, France
 9 November 1942 – St. Nazaire, France 
 17 November 1942 – St. Nazaire, France
 6 December 1942 – Lille, France
 20 December 1942* – Romilly-sur-Seine, France
 30 December 1942 – Lorient, France (flown by Lt. James A. Verinis)
 3 January 1943 – St. Nazaire, France
 13 January 1943 – Lille, France
 23 January 1943 – Lorient, France
 14 February 1943 – Hamm, Germany
 16 February 1943 – St. Nazaire, France
 27 February 1943* – Brest, France
 6 March 1943 – Lorient, France
 12 March 1943 – Rouen, France
 13 March 1943 – Abbeville, France 
 22 March 1943 – Wilhelmshaven, Germany 
 28 March 1943 – Rouen, France
 31 March 1943 – Rotterdam, Netherlands
 16 April 1943 – Lorient, France
 17 April 1943 – Bremen, Germany 
 1 May 1943 – St. Nazaire, France
 13 May 1943 – Meaulte, France (flown by Lt. C.L. Anderson)
 14 May 1943 – Kiel, Germany (flown by Lt. John H. Miller)
 15 May 1943 – Wilhelmshaven, Germany
 17 May 1943 – Lorient, France
 19 May 1943* – Kiel, Germany (flown by Lt. Anderson) 

* Sources disagree on which two of these three missions the Memphis Belle received mission credits.

Morgan's crew completed the following missions in B-17s other than the Memphis Belle:

 4 February 1943 – Emden, Germany (in B-17 DF-H 41-24515 Jersey Bounce)
 26 February 1943 – Wilhelmshaven, Germany (in B-17 41-24515)
 5 April 1943 – Antwerp, Belgium (in B-17 41-24480 Bad Penny)
 4 May 1943 – Antwerp, Belgium (in B-17 41-24527, The Great Speckled Bird)

The Memphis Belle was flown back to the United States on 8 June 1943 by a composite crew chosen by the Eighth Air Force, airmen who had flown combat aboard; they were led by Capt. Morgan for a 31-city war bond tour. Morgan's original co-pilot was Capt. James A. Verinis, who himself piloted the Memphis Belle for one mission. Verinis was promoted to aircraft commander of another B-17 for his final 16 missions and finished his tour on 13 May. He rejoined Morgan's crew as co-pilot for the flight back to the United States.

The B-17 Hell's Angels (41-24577) of the 303rd Bomb Group completed 25 combat missions on 13 May 1943, becoming the first to complete the feat, one week before the Memphis Belle.

Source of the name
The B-17 was named after pilot Robert K Morgan's sweetheart, Margaret Polk, a resident of Memphis, Tennessee. Morgan originally intended to call the bomber Little One, which was his pet name for Polk. After Morgan and copilot Jim Verinis viewed the feature film Lady for a Night, in which the leading character owns a riverboat named the Memphis Belle, he proposed that name to his aircrew. Morgan then contacted George Petty at the offices of Esquire magazine and asked him for a pinup drawing to go with the name, which Petty supplied from the magazine's April 1941 issue.

The 91st's group artist, Corporal Tony Starcer, copied, then transferred the Petty girl artwork to both sides of the forward fuselage, depicting her swimsuit in blue on the aircraft's port side and in red on the starboard side. The nose art later included 25 bomb shapes, one for each mission credit, and eight Nazi swastikas, one for each German aircraft claimed shot down by the crew. Station and crew names were stenciled below station windows on the bomber after its tour of duty was completed.

Postwar history
In his memoirs Morgan claimed that during his publicity tour he flew the Memphis Belle between the Buncombe County Courthouse and the City Hall of Asheville, North Carolina, his home town. Morgan wrote that after leaving a local airport he decided to buzz the town, telling his copilot, Captain Verinis, "I think we'll just drive up over the city and give them a little goodbye salute". Morgan turned the bomber down Patton Avenue, a main thoroughfare, toward downtown Asheville. When he observed the courthouse and the city hall (two tall buildings that are only about 50 ft (20 m) apart) dead ahead, he lowered his left wing in a 60 degree bank and flew between the structures. He wrote that the city hall housed an AAF weather detachment, whose commanding officer allegedly complained immediately to the Pentagon, but was advised by a duty officer that "Major Morgan...has been given permission to buzz by General Henry "Hap" Arnold".

On 23 Dec 1943, the Memphis Belle, having completed its combat assignment with the Eighth Air Force (8 AF), 91st Bombardment Group (91 BG) in Europe, and its subsequent stateside war bond drive, was assigned to MacDill Field, Florida. It became a B-17 aircrew and ground crew training aircraft, remaining at MacDill Field until after Victory in Europe Day (VE Day). After VE Day, the aircraft was flown to Altus AAF, Oklahoma for storage and eventual reclamation.

Display in Memphis

After the war, the Memphis Belle was saved by the mayor of Memphis, Walter Chandler, from Altus Army Airfield  where it had been consigned since 1 August 1945. It was flown to Memphis in July 1946 and stored until mid-1949, when the bomber was placed on display at the National Guard armory near the city's fairgrounds. It sat out-of-doors into the 1980s, slowly deteriorating from weather and vandalism. Souvenir hunters removed almost all of the interior components. Eventually, no instruments were left in the cockpit, and virtually every removable piece of the B-17's interior had been scavenged, often severing the wiring and control cables in the process.

In the early 1970s another mayor donated the historic B-17 back to the custody of the United States Air Force, but they allowed it to remain in Memphis, contingent on it being maintained. Efforts by the locally organized Memphis Belle Memorial Association, Inc. (MBMA) saw the bomber moved to Mud Island in the Mississippi River in 1987 for display in a new pavilion with large tarp cover. It was still open to the elements, however, and prone to weathering. Pigeons would also nest inside the tarp, and their droppings were constantly needing removal from the bomber. Dissatisfaction with the site led to efforts to create a new museum facility in Shelby County. In the summer of 2003 the Memphis Belle was disassembled and moved to a restoration facility at the former Naval Air Station Memphis in Millington, Tennessee for the work needed. In September 2004, however, the National Museum of the United States Air Force, apparently tiring of the ups-and-downs of the city's attempts to preserve the B-17, indicated that they wanted it back for restoration and eventual display at the museum at Wright-Patterson AFB near Dayton, Ohio. The Memphis Belle-The Final Chapter in Memphis, a documentary film by Ken Axmaker, Jr., focuses on the history of the Belle in Memphis, emphasizing the final days and the volunteers who tried to keep one of the most famous aircraft in the world and another Memphis icon from disappearing.

Move to Dayton
 

On 30 August 2005, the MBMA announced that a consultant that they hired determined that the MBMA would not be able to raise enough money to restore the Belle and otherwise fulfill the Air Force's requirements to keep possession of the bomber. They announced plans to return the B-17 to the National Museum of the United States Air Force at Wright-Patterson AFB near Dayton, Ohio, after a final exhibition at an airshow in Millington, Tennessee from 30 September–2 October 2005. The Belle arrived safely at the museum in mid-October 2005 and was placed in one of the museum's restoration hangars.

Restoration of the Memphis Belle was put near the top of the museum's priorities. In Friends Journal, the magazine of the museum's foundation, director Major General Charles D. Metcalf, USAF (Ret), stated that it might take eight to 10 years to fully restore the bomber.

By the spring of 2009, considerable preparatory work had been accomplished, but the fuselage and wings were still disassembled.

After stripping the paint from the aft fuselage, hundreds of names and personal messages were found scratched in the aluminum skin. It turned out that, during the B-17's war bond tour, people were allowed to leave their marks. Footage of people writing on the bomber can be seen in the documentary film The Cold Blue.

In May 2017 the museum announced the goal of completing the restoration and putting the Memphis Belle on display by 17 May 2018, the 75th anniversary of the aircraft completing its 25th mission.
On 14 March 2018, the Memphis Belle was moved into the museum's WWII Gallery in a private event and was officially unveiled two months later on 17 May 2018.

Memphis Belle film (1990)

 
Five airworthy B-17s were used in the filming of the 1990 British-American war drama Memphis Belle. Two were from the US  B-17G serial number 44-83546 and B-17F serial number 42-29782  and one from the United Kingdom, B-17G serial number 44-85784. Two French geographic survey B-17Gs were also used: serial number 44-85643 (French civilian registration F-BEEA), which crashed on take-off near the end of filming, and serial number 44-8846 (French civilian registration F-AZDX; The Pink Lady).

The B-17Gs had some sections converted for the film into the B-17F configuration. Serial number 44-83546 was converted by installing a Sperry top turret, early-style tail gunner's compartment, and waist gunner's positions; it also had its chin turret removed. After appearing in the film, the bomber continued to make air show appearances in that configuration. Originally painted with the Warner Bros. film versions of the nose art and markings, this plane (owned by restaurateur David Tallichet until his death in 2007) now carries the historic markings found on the real Memphis Belle. It is currently leased by the National Warplane Museum in Geneseo, New York, and provides historical flight experiences to the public. It carries civilian registration N3703G and is colloquially known as "the movie Memphis Belle".

Serial number 44-85784 is the last airworthy B-17 in the United Kingdom and is based at the Imperial War Museum Duxford. It is part of the USAAC World War II Memorial Flight and makes dozens of appearances across the United Kingdom and Northern Europe. It is maintained and run by volunteers, relying solely upon donations to keep it restored and flying. It carries UK civilian registration G-BEDF and is known as Sally B.

In addition to the airworthy B-17s used for the taxiing and flying sequences, others were used as background aircraft for scenes shot at the film's airbase; these were not used to portray the Memphis Belle. Serial number 42-29782 is now located at the Museum of Flight, in Seattle, Washington. It carries civilian registration N17W and is now known as the Boeing Bee.

Other aircraft named Memphis Belle
 A Republic F-105D Thunderchief (AF Ser. No. 60-0504)  from 357th Tactical Fighter Squadron of the 355th Tactical Fighter Wing based at Takhli Royal Thai Air Base during the Vietnam War was named Memphis Belle II in honor of the original B-17F. The aircraft claimed two MiG-17 kills in addition to numerous bombing missions, and was the last F-105 to fly. It is currently preserved at the National Museum of the United States Air Force at Wright-Patterson Air Force Base near Dayton, Ohio. It was donated in April 1990.
 A Rockwell B-1B Lancer (AF Ser. No. 86-0133) was named Memphis Belle. In 1996, Colonel Robert K. Morgan, pilot of the original Memphis Belle, received the opportunity to fly in this aircraft, while it served with the Georgia Air National Guard's 116th Bomb Wing at Robins AFB, Georgia.
 A General Dynamics FB-111A Aardvark (AF Ser. No. 68-0267) was also nicknamed Memphis Belle II for a period during the 1980s. It is currently located at the Strategic Air Command Museum, located in Ashland, Nebraska.

Two Boeing B-52 Stratofortresses have carried the name Memphis Belle. B-52G (AF Ser. No. 59-2594) was named Memphis Belle III and took part in the 1991 Gulf War. That aircraft was retired from active service as the B-52G was phased out of USAF service and sent to the AMARC at Davis-Monthan AFB, Arizona in October, 1992. The first B-52H (AF Ser. No. 60-0001) was named Memphis Belle IV and is currently assigned to the 2nd Bomb Wing at Barksdale Air Force Base, Louisiana, having seen action in both Iraq and Afghanistan in support of Operations Iraqi Freedom and Enduring Freedom.
 A McDonnell Douglas F-15E (AF Ser. No 89-0485) from the 336th Fighter Squadron, 4th Fighter Wing, flew with the nose art "Memphis Belle III" during Operation Iraqi Freedom in 2003.
 A Lockheed C-141 Starlifter (AF Ser. No 67-0024) became the Memphis Belle V. It was transferred to the AMARC inventory upon the retirement of all C-141s from active service in the U.S. Air Force, to include the Air Force Reserve and the Air National Guard.
 A Lockheed C-5 Galaxy (AF Ser. No. 69-0025) was named the Memphis Belle X was assigned to the 164th Airlift Wing of the Tennessee Air National Guard at Memphis Air National Guard Base.
 A Boeing C-17 Globemaster III (AF Ser. No. 93-0600) is named the Memphis Belle XI  assigned currently to the 164th Airlift Wing of the Tennessee Air National Guard at Memphis Air National Guard Base. 
 Pinnacle Airlines' first Bombardier CRJ (N8390A) is named Spirit of Memphis Belle.

See also
 Veterans' Museum (Halls, Tennessee)
 Strategic bombing during World War II
 Memphis Belle Memorial
 Pin-up girl
 Alberto Vargas
 The Cold Blue

References

Notes

Citations

Bibliography

 Bishop, Cliff T. Fortresses of the Big Triangle First. Bishops Stortford, UK: East Anglia Books, 1986, pp. 133, 135, and 233. .
 Freeman, Roger A., The Mighty Eighth War Diary. London: Jane's, 1990, pp. 36, 59. .
 Havelaar, Marion H., and Hess, William N. The Ragged Irregulars of Bassingbourn: The 91st Bombardment Group in World War II. Atglen, Pennsylvania: Schiffer, 1995, pp. 38–40, 211, 212. .
 Morgan, Col. Robert K., Ret., with Ron Powers. The Man Who Flew the Memphis Belle. New York: Dutton, 2001. .
 Thompson, Scott A. Final Cut – The Post-War B-17 Flying Fortress: The Survivors, Second edition. Missoula, Missouri: Pictorial Histories Pub. Co., 2000. .

External links

 Memphis Belle National Museum of the USAF Fact Sheet
 Memphis Belle National Museum of the USAF FAQ via Wayback Machine
 B-17F Memphis Belle Moved to WWII Gallery at dvidshub.net
 Memphis Belle Memorial Association (former custodian of the Memphis Belle)
 Restoring an Icon: The Memphis Belle at ChrisKern.Net
 Memphis Belle 1943 color documentary from inside bombing run over Germany via YouTube

Individual aircraft of World War II
Boeing B-17 Flying Fortress
Collection of the National Museum of the United States Air Force